The basic legal instrument governing copyright law in Sri Lanka is Part II (ss. 5–27) of the Intellectual Property Act, No. 36 of 2003 replacing Part II (ss. 6–24) of the Code of Intellectual Property Act, No. 52 of 1979.

Intellectual Property Act, No. 36 of 2003

Objects of copyright 

According to section 6 original intellectual creations in the literary, artistic and scientific domain are protected as works, in particular
books, pamphlets, articles, computer programs and other writings
speeches, lectures, addresses, sermons and other oral works
dramatic, dramatic musical works, pantomimes, choreographic works and other works created for stage productions
stage production of such works and expressions of folklore that are apt for such productions
musical works
audiovisual works
works of architecture
works of drawing, painting, sculpture, engraving, lithography, tapestry and other works of fine art
photographic works
works of applied art
illustrations, maps, plans, sketches and three dimensional works relative to geography, topography, architecture or science
including transformations and modifications of works as well as collections (s. 7).

Excluded are (s. 8)
ideas, concepts, principles etc.
official texts of a legislative, administrative or legal nature as well as official translations thereof
news of the day

Foreign works are covered by section 26 subsection (2).

Content and ownership of copyright: economic and moral rights 

The owner of copyright has the exclusive right to carry out or to authorize the following acts in relation to the work (economic rights, s. 9):
reproduction of the work
translation of the work
adaptation, arrangement or other transformation of the work
the public distribution of the original and each copy of the work by sale, rental, export or otherwise
rental of the original or a copy of an audiovisual work, a work embodied in a sound recording, a computer program, a data base or a musical work in the form of notation
importation of copies of the work
public display of the original or a copy of the work
public performance of the work
broadcasting of the work and
other communication to the public of the work.
Protected is the entire work as well as a substantial part thereof.

The original owner of these economic rights is the author (exception: works for hire), in the case of an audiovisual work the producer (s. 14).

The owner of a copyright may
grant licence to carry out all or any of the acts relating to the economic rights
assign or transfer the economic rights in whole or in part (s. 16).

Furthermore, the author of a work enjoys the following moral rights (s. 10):
to have his name indicated prominently on the copies and in connection with any public use of this work as far as practicable
the right to use a pseudonym and not have his name indicated
to object to any distortion, mutilation or other modification of or other derogatory action in relation or his work which would be prejudicial to his honour or reputation.

Limitation of copyright: fair use 

Acts of fair use include inter alia (s. 12)
private reproduction of a published work in a single copy
reproduction in the form of a short quotation
reproduction for teaching purposes
single copies by libraries and archives of published articles, other short works or short extracts of a work as well as single copies for the purpose of preservation

Duration of copyright 

The economic and moral rights are protected during the lifetime of the author and for a further period of 70 years from the date of his death (p.m.a.); a work of applied art is protected for 25 years from the date of the making of the work (s. 13).

Related rights 

Related rights include the rights of performers (ss. 17, 19), the rights of producers of sound recordings (ss. 18, 19) and the rights of broadcasting organisations (s. 20), each of them having a duration of 50 years (limitations: s. 21).

Copyright infringement 

When copyright is infringed, the Court has power and jurisdiction to grant injunctions, to order the impounding and destruction of illegal copies and to award damages (ss. 22, 170).

Copyright infringement may also lead to criminal charges (s. 178; accessories: s. 196; limitation: s. 202).

References

See also 
 List of parties to international copyright treaties

External links 
 National Intellectual Property Office (NIPO) of Sri Lanka
 T.S.K. Hemaratne: Intellectual Property Law and E-Commerce in Sri Lanka. Towards a Jurisprudence Based on Constitution, Roman-Dutch Law and Buddhist Principle (Thesis, London 2005)

Sri Lanka
Law of Sri Lanka